The Port of Salalah is the largest port in Oman and has been in operation since 1998. Situated in the Dhofar Governorate, on the Arabian Sea which is on the northern part of the Indian Ocean, it is centrally located at the crossroads of trade between Asia and Europe. With over 2.5 billion consumers, it serves the markets of East Africa, the Red Sea, the Indian Subcontinent and the Arabian/Persian Gulf on its doorstep.

The port is part of the Maritime Silk Road that runs from the Chinese coast via the Suez Canal to the Mediterranean, there to the Upper Adriatic region of Trieste with its rail connections to Central and Eastern Europe. 

In 2009, a container ship that had departed from this Oman port was hijacked by Somalian pirates.

History

Operator
The port has been managed by APM Terminals, the Danish terminal operating company, since 1998. The operating company, Salalah Port Services Company (S.A.O.G.), is listed on the Muscat Securities Market.

Terminals
The port operates both a container terminal and a general cargo terminal, and serves the local and regional community.

The port was formerly known as Raysut Harbour or Mina' Raysut or Port Raysut. It can accommodate large vessels up to 16m draft. It is the main Container Transhipment Terminal of the region.

See also 
 Railway stations in Oman - proposed

References

External links
 https://web.archive.org/web/20071012022603/http://www.salalahport.com/
 https://web.archive.org/web/20111109131855/http://www.apmterminals.com/africa-mideast/salalah/
 https://issuu.com/oeppa/docs/salalah_report_2016

Transport in Oman
Ports and harbours of Oman